Kuchakan (also Romanized as Kūchakān; also known as Sīāh Darreh-ye Kūchakān) is a village in Teshkan Rural District, Chegeni District, Dowreh County, Lorestan Province, Iran. At the 2006 census, its population was 212, in 40 families.

References 

Towns and villages in Dowreh County